is a sport facility of the Seiro, Niigata. Alias Albillage.

Outline
Integrated sports facilities that receive subsidy of "Sports environment maintenance model business that centers on soccer" of subsidy from Niigata Prefecture, Niigata City, and Seiro, Niigata and Albirex Niigata Ltd. and Football Association of Japan, and were constructed on Niigata east port industrial ground (site in Sapporo Breweies Niigata beer garden).

It is used as a practice place of professional soccer club Albirex Niigata.

Facilities

Clubhouse
Fitness gym
Meeting room
Locker room
Shower booth

Soccer Ground
pitch A - Natural turf Practice place only for Albirex Niigata
pitch B - Natural turf
pitch C - Natural turf
pitch D - Natural turf
pitch E - Astroturf. Lighting equipment. It is 400m track in the outside.
pitch F - Astroturf. Lighting equipment.

Land track
400m track - Only four course straight line parts are six courses. It sets it up outside of pitch E.

Futsal place
Futsal pitch with roof - Astroturf. Lighting equipment.

Others
Restaurant - "Orange cafe"
Convenience store - "Lawson Seiro Albillage store"
Albirex Niigata clubhouse
Dormitory of player of Albirex Niigata

External link
 Niigata Seiro Sports Center 

Albirex Niigata
Niigata
Sports venues in Niigata Prefecture
Seirō, Niigata